Holy Child Catholic School is located at Plaza Amado V. Hernandez in Tondo, Manila, the Philippines. It sits beside the Santo Niño de Tondo Parish Church.

History
During the Liberation Period immediately following World War II, Rt. Rev Msgr. Jose N. Jovellanos, and four Jesuit priests founded the Tondo Parochial School. It was located at the site of the defunct Instituto de Mujeres, where the Manila Cathedral School is now located. Classes began on July 2, 1945.

Later, the school was moved to its location beside the Sto. Niño Church, where the Tondo Orphanage used to stand. The government began to recognize it as a legitimate school on February 22, 1951. The school became a corporation on October 23, 1954, under the name Holy Child Catholic School(HCCS). In 1955, HCCS was granted government recognition for complete secondary and kindergarten courses. Then, the school graduated its first high school students.

The school is located at Tondo, Manila, Plaza Hernandez

Vision
A People called by the Father through Jesus Christ
to become a community of Persons with fullness of Life
witnessing to the Kingdom of God, by living the paschal mystery
in the power of the Holy Spirit with Mary as Companion.

Notable alumni
 Manny Villar – Businessman, former Speaker of the House, Senate President and presidential candidate
 Florin Hilbay – 1999 Bar Exams topnotcher, former Solicitor General

References

Catholic elementary schools in Manila
Catholic secondary schools in Manila
Education in Tondo, Manila
Educational institutions established in 1945
1945 establishments in the Philippines